God and the New Physics is a 1983 popular science book written by English scientist Paul Davies.

Overview
The book deals fundamentally with cosmology although throughout the text several sciences are mentioned, such as: physics, mathematics, neurology, and philosophy. It deals with a wide variety of philosophical problems, such as the nature of God, miracles, free will, time, and consciousness. Davies seeks to explain the changing roles of religion and science, and the way in which physics is giving insights into what were once considered solely religious or philosophical questions.

The book is written at a level which makes it suitable for all kinds of readers, from experts to beginners.

See also

About Time

1984 non-fiction books
Popular physics books
Books by Paul Davies